Collix infecta is a moth in the  family Geometridae. It is found in the Russell Islands.

References

Moths described in 1923
infecta